Charley Eugene Johns (February 27, 1905January 23, 1990) was an American politician. Johns served as the 32nd Governor of Florida from 1953 to 1955.

Johns was born in Starke, Florida. He worked as a railroad conductor
and insurance agent before being elected to the State Senate as a Democrat in 1947. Johns became the Senate President in April 1953, a position Markley Johns, his brother, had been elected to. Johns was a member of the "Pork Chop Gang", a group of 20 conservative legislators from North Florida who favored racial segregation and consolidated political power and money in the northern, more rural parts of the state. One of the Johns most remembered initiatives during his early state Senate years was to build a new, portable electric chair to be transported by truck with an electric generator and set up in a jail or a courthouse where the convicted was sentenced.

After the death of Governor Dan McCarty on September 28, 1953, Johns became the Acting Governor under the provisions of the state constitution at that time, which provided for the state Senate President to become the Acting Governor upon the death, incapacitation, or resignation of the Governor.  During his term as Acting Governor, Johns promoted highway construction, eliminating tolls on the Overseas Highway between Miami and Key West.  He was also an advocate for prison reform.  In 1954, Johns ran for election to a term as governor in his own right, but was defeated by LeRoy Collins.  After leaving office on January 4, 1955, he returned to the Florida Senate, serving until 1966.

Johns is most remembered for his support and chairmanship of the infamous Florida Legislative Investigation Committee, nicknamed the "Johns Committee" because of Johns' chairmanship. This committee participated in the Red Scare and Lavender scare by investigating communists, homosexuals, and civil rights advocates among the students and faculty of Florida's university system.  They were responsible for revoking teachers' certificates and firing university professors. By 1963, the committee had forced the dismissal or resignation of over 100 professors and deans at the University of Florida, Florida State University and the University of South Florida. One professor, Sigismond Diettrich, chair of the geography department of the University of Florida, attempted suicide after being investigated by the committee. The state legislature ended funding for the committee in 1964 after it released a report called Homosexuality and Citizenship in Florida, which infamously became known as the "Purple Pamphlet".  Its many photographs depicting homosexual acts outraged legislators and reportedly copies of the report were being sold as pornography in New York City.

References 

 Beutke, Allyson A.  Behind Closed Doors: The Dark Legacy of the Johns Committee.  Documentary, 2000.
 Schnur, James Anthony. Cold warriors in the hot sunshine :  the Johns Committee's assault on civil liberties in Florida, 1956–1965.  Master's thesis, University of South Florida, 1995.
 Stark, Bonnie. McCarthyism in Florida : Charley Johns and the Florida legislative investigation committee July.  Master's thesis, University of South Florida, 1985.

External links 

 Florida governors biography
 Homepage of Behind Closed Doors: The Dark Legacy of the Johns Committee
 

Baptists from Florida
Democratic Party Florida state senators
People from Starke, Florida
Presidents of the Florida Senate
University of Florida alumni
1905 births
1990 deaths
Democratic Party governors of Florida
20th-century American politicians
Pork Chop Gang
Conductor (rail)
Businesspeople from Florida
20th-century American businesspeople
American businesspeople in insurance
American anti-communists